is a Japanese professional shogi player, ranked 8-dan.

Early life
Kensuke Kitahama was born in Ebina, Kanagawa on December 28, 1975.

In September 1988, Kitahama entered the Japan Shogi Association's apprentice school at the rank of 6-kyū under the sponsorship of shogi professional . He was promoted to 1-dan in 1992 and obtained full professional status and the rank of 4-dan in April 1994.

Promotion history
The promotion history  for Kitahama is as follows:
 6-kyū: 1988
 1-dan: 1992
 4-dan: April 1, 1994
 5-dan: April 1, 1996
 6-dan: April 1, 1998
 7-dan: April 1, 2003
 8-dan: March 7, 2013

References

External links
ShogiHub: Professional Player Info · Kitahama, Kensuke

1975 births
Japanese shogi players
Living people
Professional shogi players
Waseda University alumni
Professional shogi players from Kanagawa Prefecture
People from Ebina, Kanagawa